The stone massage is a form of alternative medicine massage therapy and bodywork involving the placement of a number of either heated or cooled stones to the body for the purpose of pain relief, relaxation and therapy.  There are a manifold of variations and techniques used in the application of stone massage therapy, deriving from a variety of traditional practices. Stone massages are primarily used to alleviate physical pain issues, however, are also used to promote emotional and spiritual wellbeing in practice.

Origin and History
Stone massage and similar practices involving the placement of objects of different temperatures have been dated back to ancient civilisations as a form of healing and therapy. Cultures including native American, Hawaiian and many South Pacific nations have practiced similar methods of ritual and technique to provide physical and spiritual ease.  The traditional Hawaiian healing massage ‘Lomilomi’ involves the use of warmed Lomi stones in order to increase areas of blood flow in the body and provide a healing.   Similar practices in China have also dated back 2000 years involving the use of heated stones to stimulate improved internal organ function. Such traditional practices have evolved and influenced the application of modern stone massage practices.

The re-emergence of such stone massage techniques was seen in 1993 by Mary Nelson with the development of a form of massage utilising hot and cold stones referred to as LaStone Therapy. This form of massage quickly rose to popularity becoming a multi-million dollar industry and has a strong focus on spiritual healing centering around chakras and energy channelling.  Many massage therapy parlours providing stone massages offer LaStone Therapy due to its success amongst clients and the established reputable name for the process. These modern forms of stone massage combine techniques utilised in Swedish massage and deep tissue massage.

Technique

Volcanic stones, typically basalt are placed in hot water typically at a temperature ranging between 40-60 degrees Celsius (100-140 degrees Fahrenheit) to reach a suitable temperature or placed in chilled water to achieve a chilled stone of -5-25 degrees Celsius 25-75 degrees Fahrenheit) for the practice, the use of a calibrated thermometer is common and recommended to reach the ideal temperatures required. In order to maintain adequate external skin hydration massage oils or lotions are commonly applied to the client’s skin.  Sufficient internal hydration is also essential for the treatment due to an increase in body temperature to be experience, which can be achieved through clients consuming water before, during and after a session. A sheet or towel is placed on the client’s skin to provide a barrier between the hot or cold stones and their bare skin, preventing potential burns or discomfort. The stones are then placed on the client according to areas of concern or needing treatment, including the back, legs, arms or feet. Additionally, the stones are held by the massage therapist and massage into the muscle acting as an extension of their hands.

The temperature of the stones are consistently monitored to ensure they remain at a safe and comfortable temperature that will produce the most effective results and enjoyable experience for the client. Controlling the heat of the water in which the stones are warmed or cooled is essential to produce stones at a suitable temperature necessary for the treatment.

Some therapists may also perform a Swedish massage prior to the application of stones in order to warm and loosen up the muscles. The duration of stone massages typically range from 60 to 90 minutes depending on the technique used and needs of the client.

Training 
In order for an adequate and successful stone massage to take place a professionally trained masseuse needs to conduct the massage. Due to the potential dangers and harms associated with the practice of stone massages, extensive, appropriate training is necessary to carry out a safe, enjoyable experience for the client.  It is necessary to gain knowledge of the correct adaption of the practice depending on the needs of the client and methods in which to incorporate stone massages into other massage practices.  Certification from professionally recognised massage associations is mandatory to conduct a stone massage in a professional setting. Internationally, to maintain professional standards, stone message therapists are able to obtain Continuing Professional Education (CPE) points which can be achieved through training programmes and courses. With the potential dangers and risks associated with the practice, a manifold of liability insurance options are available for therapists conducting stone massages. It is highly recommended to obtain background knowledge and training in principles of hydrotherapy to safely carry out a stone massage therapy. Training to participate in stone massages focuses significantly on the adaptive approach necessary to conducting this treatment, emphasising the importance of understanding the needs and current condition of the client.

Mary Nelson, creator of the modern stone massage through LaStone Therapy recognised the need for high-quality, extensive training and instruction in the field of stone massage. Nelson developed a group of trained therapists to teach and train the practice internationally and produced informational videos to highlight effective methods of the stone massage.

Effectiveness and Benefits 
Stone massage therapy is often engaged with for the acknowledged benefits that can be received from taking part in such a process. A primary benefit associated with the practice is that of stimulating blood flow in the circulatory system through the heat and movement of the stones. Stone massages also ease muscle pain and often, the presence of muscle tension and spasms through reducing inflammation and relaxing muscles through a combination of both the heat and movement experience during the practice to access deeper tissues. This method of massage is also commonly recommended for physically sensitive individuals as it allows for a deeper tissue massage without excessive hand treatment from the therapist. 

Many also engage in the practice due to its relaxational and mental benefits that can be reaped from undertaking a stone massage. The environment and physical effects experienced from a stone massage assist in inducing a state of deep relaxation for many participants, which often improves mental clarity and improves in destressing for many individuals. Alongside this, studies have shown that stone massages and related therapies have assisted in improving sleep quality for individuals. A study conducted at the Urmia University of Medical Science found that basalt hot stone massage therapy “…can successfully contribute in reducing sleep disturbances, improving quality of sleep and enhancing comfort level…”. The study applied five of the specialised stones to the area of the first, second, third, fourth and fifth chakra to stimulate an enhancement of sleep quality.

There have also found to benefits received by the massage therapist in conducting a hot stone massage. As the stones carry out the mass of the contact and work with the client, the instance of stresses and strain being experienced by the therapist in the areas of hands, wrists and the upper body are reduced. The occurrence of stress injuries caused by repetitive activity in the fingers and hand are commonly diminished for the therapist.

Dangers and Risk 
There are a number of dangers and risks associated with stone massage therapy, particularly due to the presence of high temperatures being exposed to the skin. Improper heating of the stones can lead to a higher potential for burns on the skin caused by unsafe and uneven temperatures of the stones being put on clients.

There are also certain risk involved in receiving a stone massage for individuals with specific medical conditions. Medical conditions including diabetes, epilepsy, skin conditions and heart disease and neuropathy pose a contraindication with stone massage as a treatment and have potential for causing harm. Clients with recent skin or shallow abrasions such as cuts, burns, bruising and varicose are advised to avoid stone massages as this therapy has potential to increase further injury or greater concerns such as tissue damage. Such conditions or minor injuries also pose risk for higher chances of infection from bacterial exposure from the stones, massage oils or the masseuse.

The impairment subsequent from drug and alcohol use largely impede on the safety and effectiveness of stone massage therapy. The  effect of such substances often limit an individual’s judgement and impulsive control, both necessary to actively engage in a stone massage. Participation and contribution from the client are essential in a stone massage due to the risk and uncertainty of reaction from the temperature of the stones, a reaction that could be largely desensitised due to the effects of alcohol or drugs.

Misconceptions of the Practice 
There are a manifold of common misconceptions surrounding the practice of stone massage largely derived from graphic and media representations of the practice. Mainstream representation of the massage often involves the stones being directly placed on the clients skin, whilst the real life application of the practice rarely involves this method, instead using a cloth or towel to separate the stones from direct contact with the skin. Many individuals avoid the practice due to fear of burns or pain from this widespread misconception. It is often commonly misconceived that the massage is a set, standard practice and routine that is applied to every client.  Professional treatments vary depending on the needs of the client and skills acquired by the therapist to suit the therapy being applied. Representation of the practice commonly shows the stones arranged in an orderly pattern down the centre of the client’s back, tracing the spine. The specialist stones are placed all around the body, commonly avoiding the crevice of the spine, focusing on the areas of concern for the client.

Supply Companies and Industries 
As the stone massage utilises equipment and techniques that were new to the massage industry and unfamiliar to practioneers, the rise in demand for the practice evidenced a necessity for specialised equipment and resources. A number of stone supply companies were developed to fulfil the need for greater supplies of the stones required for the practice. Firms such as Desert Stone People, RubRocks and Nature’s Stones Inc became prominent suppliers and distributors of the stones to spas and parlours predominantly across the United States. The development of equipment suited towards heating and cooling the stones was also essential is establishing adequate and safe applications of this process, with products such as the ‘Spa-Pro Massage Stone Heater being designed and distributed.

Notable Media Representation 
As the stone massage increased in popularity internationally as a form of therapy and mainstream massage, the practice was incorporated into media including films, tv shows, advertisement and books. The 2006 movie Big Momma's House 2 features a notable scene in which the characters receive a hot stone massage. The children’s film The Lego Movie 2: The Second Part also features a scene including a hot stone massage.

See also
Bamboo massage

References 

Manual therapy
Massage therapy
Alternative medicine